Viktor Alekseevich Balala (born in 1961 in Vinnytsia, Vinnytsia Oblast, Ukrainian SSR, Soviet Union ) is a former Minister of Justice of Transnistria. He studied law in Russia and is a lawyer by profession. He was a member of the Supreme Soviet of Russia. The ministry has several purposes, including making draft laws purposes.

He stepped down in October 2005 amid rumors of corruption when Anatoliy Anatolievich Guretskiy was named to the post.

1961 births
Living people
Politicians from Vinnytsia
Transnistrian politicians